David James Smith (born 14 July 1935) is a retired Anglican bishop of the Church of England.

Biography
Born in Hertfordshire, he was educated at Hertford Grammar School (now Richard Hale School) and King's College London,. He was ordained in 1959.

His first post was as an assistant curate at All Saints' Gosforth, after which he became the assistant curate of St Francis High Heaton. Following this, he was Priest in Charge St Mary Magdalene, Longbenton and then Vicar of Longhirst with Hebron. He next became Vicar of St Mary's Monkseaton. He was subsequently the Rural Dean of Tynemouth and, in 1981, was collated Archdeacon of Lindisfarne. In 1987, he was ordained to the episcopate as Bishop of Maidstone and was translated in 1992 to be the Bishop of Bradford (until 2002). From 1990 to 1992, he was also Bishop to the Forces.

He was a member of the House of Lords from 1997 to 2002. In retirement, he continues to serve as an honorary assistant bishop in the Diocese of York and Diocese of Europe.

He is a Fellow of King's College London (FKC) and, in 2001, was awarded an Honorary Doctorate (DUniv) from the University of Bradford.

He is married to Mary and has a son and a daughter.

References

 David Smith

1935 births
Alumni of King's College London
Associates of King's College London
Fellows of King's College London
Archdeacons of Lindisfarne
Bishops of Maidstone
Bishops of Bradford (diocese)
Living people
Bishops to the Forces
20th-century Church of England bishops